Akkare Ninnoru Maran is a 1985 Indian Malayalam-language comedy film directed by Girish and written by Sreenivasan from a story by Jagadeesh, it was produced by G. Suresh Kumar and Sanal Kumar. The film stars Maniyanpilla Raju, Menaka, Sukumari and Innocent. The film has musical score by C. Rajamani and songs by Kannur Rajan.

Plot

K.P. Thankappan Nair is a rich man, who has cheated his sister out of her property. Her son Achuthan wants to reclaim the land forcibly taken by his uncle, as well as marry his daughter, Nandini, with whom he is in love. He and his friends hatch a plan to hoodwink Thankappan Nair, pretending to have earned a fortune working in Dubai.

Cast

Production
Gireesh, who was working as an associate director to Priyadarshan was contacted by Anand, who produced the movie Parayanum Vayya Parayathirikkanum Vayya and expressed his interest in producing a movie with Gireesh as director. Later, Anand dropped the project. However, Gireesh secured another producer with help from a few friends. Shooting was completed in 26 days in and around Palghat and Thiruvilwamala.

Soundtrack
The music was composed by Kannur Rajan and the lyrics were written by Priyadarshan.

Release
 This film was released on 5 September 1985.

Box office 
The film was critically well received and was a box office hit.

Legacy
There were some comedic dialogues in the film which became catchphrases, such as in the Arabic translation scene in the film.

References

External links 
 

1985 films
1980s Malayalam-language films
Indian comedy-drama films